Horace Alfred Porter (July 20, 1879 – February 13, 1953) was a Canadian politician. He served in the Legislative Assembly of New Brunswick as member of the Liberal party from 1935 to 1939.

References

1879 births
1953 deaths
20th-century Canadian politicians
New Brunswick Liberal Association MLAs
British emigrants to Canada